C-21, C 21, or C21 may refer to:
 C21 Sako TRG M10 Sniper Weapon System, Canadian Armed Forces sniper rifle.
 C21 (band), a Danish boy band
 C21 (album), 2003
 C-21 Dolphin, a flying boat used by the United States Army Air Corps
 , a 1909 British C class submarine
 Learjet C-21, an American military transport aircraft
 Sauber C21, a 2002 racing car
 Space Adventures C-21, a Russian design for a suborbital rocket plane for Space Adventures
 Anal cancer (ICD-10 code: C21)
 Center Game (Encyclopaedia of Chess Openings code: C21)
 Caldwell 21 or NGC 4449, an irregular galaxy in the constellation Canes Venatici
 Carbon-21 (C-21 or 21C), an isotope of carbon
 Catch 21, a television game show based on blackjack

See also
 21st century 
 Century 21 (disambiguation)
 21c (disambiguation)